The Franz Kafka Prize is an international literary award presented in honour of Franz Kafka, the Jewish, Bohemian, German-language novelist.  The prize was first awarded in 2001 and is co-sponsored by the Franz Kafka Society and the city of Prague, Czech Republic.

Award information and history

At a presentation held annually in the Old Town Hall (Prague), the recipient receives $10,000, a diploma, and a bronze statuette. Each award is often called the "Kafka Prize" or "Kafka Award".

The award earned some prestige in the mid 2000s by foreshadowing the Nobel Prize when two of its winners went on to win the Nobel Prize in Literature the same year, Elfriede Jelinek (2004) and Harold Pinter (2005).

The criteria for winning the award include the artwork's "humanistic character and contribution to cultural, national, language [sic] and religious tolerance, its existential, timeless character, its generally human validity and its ability to hand over [sic] a testimony about our times."

Award winners
Previous winners.

See also
 List of literary awards
 List of Czech literary awards

References

External links
Official website

2001 establishments in the Czech Republic
Awards established in 2001
Czech literary awards
Franz Kafka
Kafka
Literary awards honoring writers
Literary awards honoring lifetime achievement